Santolina chamaecyparissus (syn. S. incana), known as cotton lavender or lavender-cotton, is a species of flowering plant in the family Asteraceae, native to the western and central Mediterranean.

Nomenclature
The specific epithet chamaecyparissus means "like Chamaecyparis" (ground cypress), though it is not closely related to that plant. It is also not closely related to either cotton or lavender, despite its common name "cotton lavender".
Recognized varieties or subspecies are
 var. etrusca Lacaita ≡ S. etrusca (Lacaita) Marchi & D'Amato	
 subsp. magonica O. Bolòs, Molin. & P. Monts. ≡ S. magonica (O. Bolòs, Molin. & P. Monts.) Romo, = var. teucrietorum O. Bolòs & Vigo
 var. pectinata f. insularis Gennari ex Fiori ≡ S. insularis (Gennari ex Fiori) Arrigoni
 var. vedranensis O. Bolòs & Vigo ≡ S. vedranensis (O. Bolòs & Vigo) L. Sáez, M. Serrano, S. Ortiz & R. Carbajal

Description
Densely covered in aromatic, grey-green leaves, in summer it produces masses of yellow, button-like composite flowerheads, held on slender stems above the foliage. The disc florets are tubular and there are no ray florets.

Cultivation
This plant is valued in cultivation as groundcover or as an edging plant for a hot, sunny, well-drained spot, though it may be short-lived. Once established, plants can tolerate dry and poor soils. Its compact shape can be maintained by cutting back in spring.

Uses
In cosmetics it is used as a tonic.
It is an effective fumigant

Pathogens
Phytophthora tentaculata

Photo gallery

References

External links
Flora Europaea: Santolina

Anthemideae
Plants described in 1753
Taxa named by Carl Linnaeus
Flora of Malta